Episinus truncatus is a small dark tangle-web spider, with a palearctic distribution.

Episinus truncatus is found in Europe. It is notably found in Lithuania. In England, it is mostly found on heather and sometimes on coastal grassland.

It spins a simple web near the ground. It can grow up to 4 mm and is very similar to Episinus angulatus.

References

Theridiidae
Spiders of Europe
Spiders described in 1809
Palearctic spiders